Przybyszyce  is a village in the administrative district of Gmina Jeżów, within Brzeziny County, Łódź Voivodeship, in central Poland.

The village has an approximate population of 210.

References

Przybyszyce